Melika Mirhosseini Vakili (born 2 March 1996) is an Iranian taekwondo practitioner. In 2021, she won the silver medal in the women's 67 kg event at the 2021 Asian Taekwondo Championships held in Beirut, Lebanon. She also won the silver medal in her event at the 2017 Islamic Solidarity Games held in Baku, Azerbaijan.

In 2017, she won one of the bronze medals in the women's 67 kg event at the 2017 Summer Universiade held in Taipei, Taiwan. Two years later, she also won one of the bronze medals in the women's 73 kg event at the 2019 Summer Universiade held in Naples, Italy.

References

External links 
 

Living people
1996 births
Sportspeople from Tehran
Iranian female taekwondo practitioners
Taekwondo practitioners at the 2018 Asian Games
Asian Games competitors for Iran
Asian Taekwondo Championships medalists
Islamic Solidarity Games competitors for Iran
Islamic Solidarity Games medalists in taekwondo
Universiade bronze medalists for Iran
Universiade medalists in taekwondo
Medalists at the 2017 Summer Universiade
Medalists at the 2019 Summer Universiade
21st-century Iranian women